Ingeborg von Kusserow (28 January 1919 – 14 April 2014) was a German film actress.

Biography
Kusserow was born in Wollstein, Province of Posen, Germany (today Wolsztyn, Poland).

She starred in Nazi propaganda films during the Third Reich, which she wrote about in a 1949 memoir I Was Hitler's Mickey Mouse.

Kusserow married Percy Graf Welsburg in November 1941; they hoped to get away to Switzerland and Italy but in fact had to remain in Berlin throughout the war, which she describes in a 1948 memoir Enough, no More. They finally emigrated to Britain in 1947 and lived in St John's Wood, London and she restarted her acting career, usually appearing as Ingeborg Wells. Kusserow retired in 1960 and divorced Welsburg, but married again in 1968 to Kenneth Slingsby-Fahn (1913–2007), a retired RAF officer. Their life together in their garden flat in Abercorn Place has been recounted in a memoir by a neighbour.

In 1979 she and her husband relocated to a cottage in Houghton, West Sussex where Kenneth died in 2007. Kusserow lived alone until 2013, when she suffered a fall and had to live in a care home until her death a year later.

She is known for her appearance in the 1951 film Captain Horatio Hornblower and in the German adaptation of the play You Know I Can't Hear You When the Water's Running. She played Lady Irina in episode 21 "The Vandals" in The Adventures of Robin Hood (1956).

Death

Kusserow died on 14 April 2014. Before her death she reportedly fell and broke a femur.  She survived but as a result of the injury her health declined severely.

Selected filmography

 Three Soldiers in the Kaiserjäger (1933)
 The Court Concert (1936) - Zofe Babette
 When Women Keep Silent (1937) - Jenny - Zofe bei Wörners
 Love Can Lie (1937) - Britta Torsten
 Daphne and the Diplomat (1937) - Matz
 My Friend Barbara (1937) - Lucie
 Rätsel um Beate (1937) - Schauspielerin, 1.Etage
 Wie einst im Mai (1938)
 Kleiner Mann ganz groß (1938) - Nina Würbel, Plakatmalerin
 The Girl of Last Night (1938) - Evelyn Barrow - Tochter
 Was tun, Sybille (1938) - Primanerin
 A Night in May (1938) - Friedl
 Drei Unteroffiziere (1938) - Lisbeth, Telefonistin
Renate in the Quartet (1939) - Li, Frau Ambergs Nichte
In letzter Minute (1939) - Maria
Herz ohne Heimat (1940) - Baby
Der dunkle Punkt (1940)
 Counterfeiters (1940) - Else Bornemann
Leichte Muse (1941) - Tochter Jette Müller
Alles aus Liebe (1943) - Zoobesucherin (uncredited)
Das Konzert (1944) - Delfine
Tell the Truth (1946) - Maria - seine Braut
Der große Fall (1949) - Eine reizende Chansonsängerin
Golden Arrow (1949) - 1st Nightclub hostess
Captain Horatio Hornblower (1951) - Hebe (Lady Barbara's Maid)
One Wild Oat (1951) - Gloria Samson
Chelsea Story (1951) - Janice
Two on the Tiles (1951) - Madeleine
Death Is a Number (1951) - Gipsy Girl
Secret People (1952) - Shoe Shop Girl
King of the Underworld (1952) - Marie
Women of Twilight (1952) - Lili, the German Boarder
House of Blackmail (1953) - Emma
Double Exposure (1954) - Maxine Golder
Child's Play (1954) - Lea Blotz
Port of Escape (1956) - Lucy
Across the Bridge (1957) - Mrs. Scarff

References

External links
 
 

1919 births
2014 deaths
German film actresses
People from the Province of Posen
People from Wolsztyn